Opéra de Baugé is an opera festival held each summer near the Loire town of Baugé-en-Anjou, 40 kilometres east of Angers, France.

From 2003 to 2011 the festival was held in the gardens of Les Capucins (pictured), a private house and former convent.  In 2016 the festival returned to Les Capucins after 4 years in a theatre in the centre of the town.

The festival is modelled on England's Glyndebourne Festival Opera, and performances feature 90-minute intervals during which members of the audience picnic or dine in the attached restaurant.  Many of the cast and orchestra are English, and the performances are surtitled in both English and French.  In recent years the festival has drawn an audience of 2,500-3,000 to the town, including large numbers who travel from England.

The 2019 season will feature performances of Die Zauberflöte (The Magic Flute) (Mozart), Il trovatore (Verdi) and Alfonso und Estrella (Schubert).

The opera is noted for its authentic performances, with a full orchestra and chorus in support of fully staged productions.  The festival has increasingly attracted soloists from across Europe and beyond.  Singers have gone on to win prizes including the Kathleen Ferrier Award and positions in the Young Artists Programme at Covent Garden.

Bernadette Grimmett has been artistic director of the festival since its inception.

Rarities or unusual operas performed
2003: Albert Herring (Benjamin Britten)
2004: Martha (von Flotow), Les pêcheurs de perles (The Pearl Fishers, Bizet)
2005: Rodelinda (Handel); Dido and Aeneas (Purcell)/The Widow of Ephesus (Dibdin)
2006: Riccardo primo (Handel)
2007: Orfeo ed Euridice (Gluck)
2008: Theodora (Handel)
2009: A Midsummer Night's Dream (Britten); La finta giardiniera (Mozart)
2010: Giulio Cesare (Handel)
2011: Le Postillon de Lonjumeau (Adam)
2012: Roméo et Juliette (Gounod)
2014: Pagliacci (Leoncavallo)
2015: The Bear (Walton); Façade (Walton)
2016: Albert Herring (Benjamin Britten); L'incoronazione di Poppea (Monteverdi)
2017: Orphée aux enfers (Offenbach)

See also
List of opera festivals

External links
Opéra de Baugé website
Website of Ville de Baugé (in French)
Interview with Opéra de Baugé tenor Ben Johnson and pianist James Southall on winning the Kathleen Ferrier Award.

 
Music festivals in France
Music festivals established in 2003
Opera festivals
Classical music festivals in France
2003 establishments in France
Tourist attractions in Loire (department)